Couchey is a commune in the Côte-d'Or department and region of Bourgogne-Franche-Comté in eastern France.

Population

Wine 
The vineyards of Couchey are part of the appellation d'origine contrôlée (AOC)  Marsannay.

See also
Communes of the Côte-d'Or department

References

Communes of Côte-d'Or
Côte-d'Or communes articles needing translation from French Wikipedia